Geraldo Vandré (born Geraldo Pedrosa de Araujo Dias, September 12, 1935) is a Brazilian singer, composer and guitar player.

In 1966 his song Disparada (Gone Off), interpreted by Jair Rodrigues, was a success at the Record Festival. The song rose to number one, tied with Chico Buarque's "A banda".

Later in 1966, the group Quarteto Novo was created to accompany him in concert and on recordings and released a landmark album in 1967.

In 1968 Vandre entered his song Pra não dizer que não falei de flores (also known as Caminhando (Walking)) in the International Song Festival. The song had the following refrain:

This was thought to be a call to fight the dictatorship in charge. The song lost to "Sabiá" by Chico Buarque and Tom Jobim. Also in 1968, still with the AI-5, Vandré had to go into exile. The first artist ever to sing Caminhando after censorship's lift was Simone in 1979, reaching enormous success from both public and critics.

First he stayed at the farm of the late Guimarães Rosa, who had died the previous year, then he proceeded to Chile, and finally to France.

Since returning to Brazil in 1973, Vandré has been living and composing in São Paulo. He discounts rumors that he has been tortured, or that he was a anti-militarist, saying that this image was fabricated. One of his recent songs has been "Fabiana", written in honor of the Brazilian Air Force (Força Aérea Brasileira – FAB) and presented at the São Paulo Municipal Library some time in the 1990s.

Discography
1964: Geraldo Vandré
1965: Hora de Lutar
1966: 5 Anos de canção
1968: Canto Geral
1973: Das Terras de Benvirá

References and notes

1935 births
Living people
20th-century Brazilian male singers
20th-century Brazilian singers
Brazilian male guitarists
Brazilian composers
People from Paraíba
Música Popular Brasileira musicians
Bossa nova musicians
Male jazz musicians